Mick Haggerty is an English graphic designer, illustrator, art director, video director and artist. Haggerty has received four Grammy Award nominations for Best Recording Package, and in 1980 was jointly awarded, with Mike Doud, the Grammy for Supertramp's Breakfast in America (1979). He also received a Grammy nomination for Best Music Video (short form) in 1986 for The Daryl Hall and John Oates Video Collection.

Background 
Born in England and educated in London at the Central School of Art and the Royal College of Art, he moved to Los Angeles in 1973. During the following decades he produced images for many artists. Starting in 1980 he directed many of the first music videos for artists. His editorial illustration includes covers for Time, Vanity Fair, New York Magazine, and New West Magazine. He was a founding partner in various design groups, Art Attack with John Kehe (1975), Neo Plastics with C.D.Taylor (1980) and Brains with Steve Samiof (1994). He served as Art Director at Virgin Records (1992) and Warner Music (2001). Haggerty was a member of the faculty of Otis Parsons School of Design (now Otis College of Art and Design) from 1983–91. His work is included in the collection of the Museum of Modern Art in New York.

Notable album covers
 Electric Light Orchestra – The Night the Light Went On in Long Beach, 1974
 Electric Light Orchestra – Face the Music, (with John Kehe), 1975
 Pointer Sisters - Steppin', 1975 (1976 Grammy Award nominee)
 Hot Tuna - Yellow Fever, 1975
 Jerry Lee Lewis – Jerry Lee Lewis, 1979
 Supertramp – Breakfast in America, 1979 (1980 Grammy Award winner) 
 Gamma – Gamma 2, 1980
 The Police – Ghost in the Machine 1981
 Jimi Hendrix – Kiss the Sky, 1982
 The Go-Go's – Vacation, 1982 (1983 Grammy Award nominee)
 David Bowie – Let's Dance, 1983
 David Bowie – Tonight, 1984
 Simple Minds – Alive and Kicking, 1985
 Orchestral Manoeuvres in the Dark – The Pacific Age, 1986
 David Bowie – Never Let Me Down, 1987
 Tom Petty and The Heartbreakers – Let Me Up (I've Had Enough), 1987
 Public Image Ltd – 9, 1989
 Jellyfish – Bellybutton cover spread, 1990
 Keith Richards – Main Offender, 1992
 Jellyfish – Spilt Milk, 1993
 Richard Thompson – Mirror Blue, 1994
 Glassjaw - Worship and Tribute, 2002 (2003 Grammy Award nominee)

References

Grammy Award winners
English art directors
Alumni of the Royal College of Art
Alumni of the Central School of Art and Design
Year of birth missing (living people)
Living people